Revenge of the Snakes or (Turkish language: Yılanların öcü) is a 1962 Turkish realist drama film directed by Metin Erksan and based on a novel by Fakir Baykurt. The film covered issues of an unwanted pregnancy in a small farming village and addressed numerous moral and social issues. The film was remade in 1985.

Cast
Fikret Hakan as  Kara Bayram
Nurhan Nur as  Hatçe
Aliye Rona as Irazca
Erol Taş as  Haceli
Kadir Savun as  Ak Ali
Ali Sen as The headman
Sadiye Arcýman as  Fatma
T. Fikret Uçak
Hakki Haktan

External links 

Films set in Turkey
1962 films
1960s Turkish-language films
1962 drama films
Films directed by Metin Erksan
Films based on Turkish novels
Turkish drama films